Róbert Vittek (born 1 April 1982) is a Slovak former professional footballer who played as a forward.

With 23 goals in 82 matches since 2001, Vittek is the second top scorer in the history of the Slovakia national football team. He played for Slovakia at the 2010 FIFA World Cup, scoring four goals.

Club career

Slovan Bratislava
Vittek began his career in the youth team of hometown club Slovan Bratislava in 1999. He was then promoted to the first team for the 1999–2000 campaign. While still a youth player, he signed a preliminary agreement with Real Madrid, but the move to Spain fell through due to injury. He was 19 at the time and scored 19 goals for Slovan. The next season, he played only three games, scoring twice. Before moving to Germany, Vittek had a trial at Birmingham City and impressed the club enough that they made a move for him. However, the move never materialized.

1. FC Nürnberg
He came to Nürnberg in 2003, while the club was still in the 2. Bundesliga, helping the team earn promotion to the Bundesliga for the 2004–05 campaign. During the first half of the 2004–05 season, Vittek signed a long-term contract.

Vittek scored only five goals in the 2004–05 campaign, and the following year he failed to score in the first 17 matches before the winter break.  With the arrival of new coach Hans Meyer, however, he scored 16 goals in the final 16 games of the 2005–06 season. He made league history in Spieltag 24 and 25, becoming the first Bundesliga player to score a combined six goals in two consecutive games. In all, Vittek had five multi-goal games on the season, and his 16 goals were good for fifth place on the Bundesliga scoring charts. Vittek's rise was mirrored by his team as 1. FC Nürnberg rose from near-relegation to eighth place. He established a new record by scoring six goals in a row without an intervening goal from another player in the last two games against MSV Duisburg and 1. FC Köln respectively. In the next game, he scored two more goals against Werder Bremen, and just missed the league record of Lothar Emmerich and Tomislav Marić with four braces. His 2005–06 performance made Vittek a sought-after player in European football. Hamburger SV was the main Bundesliga club rumored to be courting Vittek. Dynamo Kyiv offered a €10 million transfer fee for Vittek in June 2006, but Nürnberg rejected the offer. Lokomotiv Moscow was also reported to have interest in Vittek's services.

The 2006–07 season was again a mixed season for Vittek as he just scored four goals in 24 games due to Markus Schroth and Ivan Saenko making the score sheet. He played only three game of the cup until the quarter finals of the DFB-Pokal and returned only in the final, but stayed only on the bench which on 26 May 2007, Nürnberg won the DFB-Pokal beating VfB Stuttgart 3–1. In December 2006, Vittek won the Slovak Footballer of the Year award. During the season in October, Vittek signed a contract extension, keeping him until 2010 and this season began the decline for Vittek at Nürnberg.

The 2007–08 season was a negative season for Vittek as he scored once in 17 games due to injury and lack of fitness. On 24 July 2007, he scored two goals for Nürnberg in the DFB-Ligapokal, but his team lost 4–2 to Schalke 04. On 5 August 2007, Vittek scored his first hat-trick since two seasons ago in the first round of DFB-Pokal in a 6–0 thrashing against Victoria Hamburg. On 1 September 2007, Vittek received a red card for the first time in his Bundesliga career after a second bookable offense in a 1–1 draw against Energie Cottbus. Despite his sending off, a few days later, Vittek was injured after suffering pain on his knee, resulting in him being out of action throughout the rest of 2007 and was expected not to be available until January despite the operation being a success. After the injury time, his return was delayed due to the flu. The long forced break was also responsible for the fact that he was never used in the 2007–08 UEFA Cup. On 1 March 2008, Vittek began to make his first appearance for the club since his injury, coming on as a substitute in a 2–1 loss against Hannover 96 and 33 days later on 5 April, Vittek scored his first goal (and only goal) of the season in a 3–1 win over Eintracht Frankfurt.

The 2008–09 season was short-lived for Vittek before his move to Lille as he made two appearances and in his last match with a 2–1 loss against 1. FC Kaiserslautern provided an assist for Isaac Boakye to score the only goal in the game.

Lille
Struggling to get to previous form, he went to play to French club Lille for a reported €5.5 million in 2008, where he was awarded a contract until 2012. On 31 August 2008, Vittek made his debut for the club in a 2–1 win over Bordeaux and scored his first goal in a 3–0 win over Saint-Étienne three months later since making his debut. He went on to help the club finally with a total of five goals in 26 games for the fifth place, and thus to qualify for the UEFA Europa League.

On 30 July 2009, he first played in the qualifying round of the 2009–10 UEFA Champions League against FK Sevojno and scored a goal. In the league start on 9 August he was in the starting lineup in a 2–1 loss against Lorient and two weeks later on 23 August 2009, Vittek scored his first goal in a 1–1 draw against Toulouse. After 17 games without scoring, Vittek scored in a 2–1 loss against Sochaux.

M.K.E. Ankaragücü
On 1 February 2010, Vittek left the French club and signed a half year loan deal with MKE Ankaragücü. On 7 February 2010, Vittek made his debut for the club in a 0–0 draw against Bursaspor and scored his first goal in the next game with a 1–1 draw against İstanbul BB. Vittek scored a brace in a 3–0 win over Kayserispor on 21 March 2010.

After the World Cup campaign, Ankaragücü bought him from Lille permanently despite interest from his former club Nürnberg. Since signing permanently for Ankaragücü, Vittek never produced his form like last time when he was on loan as he just made 12 appearances and scored once against Bucaspor in a 5–3 win and also set up a goal for Murat Duruer on 21 April 2010.

In the winter transfer break of 2010–11, FC Red Bull Salzburg were interested in signing Vittek. After the transfer arrangements with MKE Ankaragücü were cleared, the club officials of the Turkish side claimed to have sent a confirmation fax on 31 January 2011, shortly before midnight to Salzburg. The fax was received in Salzburg one minute past midnight and the clock of the Transfer Matching System (TMS) of FIFA registered it at 00:03 and therefore invalid. Ankaragücü made a faulty fax machine responsible for the incident. On 23 February 2011, it was ruled by the FIFA that Vittek was not joining the reigning Austrian champion.

Trabzonspor
On 1 September 2011, Vittek signed a two-year contract for Turkish club Trabzonspor for a reported fee of €600,000.

On 14 September 2011, Vittek made his Champions League debut, coming on as a substitute in a 1–0 win over Inter Milan. On 17 September 2011, Vittek made his debut for the club but soon in the game, he suffered an injury on a tear in the anterior cruciate ligament of the right knee to which sidelined him for about six months. In April 2012, Vittek was again training with the squad and planned to return at the very end of the season. By August, Vittek made his first appearance for the club since suffering an injury in a 1–1 draw against Kardemir Karabükspor.

İstanbul BB
In February 2013, he signed one and half year contract with İstanbul BB. He didn't make any league appearances for the club, mainly due to injury problems.

Return to Slovan Bratislava
On 3 September 2013, he signed a one-year deal with his hometown club ŠK Slovan Bratislava. Vittek was assigned the number 33 shirt. He made his official debut on 14 September, scoring a goal in the 4–2 away win over FK Dukla Banská Bystrica in a league match. In the s2013–14 season, Slovan won the league title with Vittek scoring 12 league goals. However, Vittek has been troubled with injuries in recent years. He missed last five games of the 2013–14 season due to an injury. Similarly, he spent two months on the sidelines due to problems with his knee in the 2014–15 season.

On 23 July 2015, he netted a hat-trick in a 5–1 win away to University College Dublin as Slovan advanced 6–1 on aggregate into the third qualifying round of the UEFA Europa League. He repeated the feat in the next round's second leg, a 3–3 home draw against FC Krasnodar which saw his team eliminated nonetheless.

On 6 July 2016, it was announced that Vittek will not play for Slovan anymore after he was offered the manager's job at the end of his player contract.

Debrecen
On 5 October 2016, Vittek joined Hungarian first division side Debreceni VSC for the remainder of the 2016–17 season.

International career

Vittek was part of the Slovak national team since 2001. His tally of 81 caps makes him their third most-capped player after Miroslav Karhan and Marek Hamšík. Vittek scored Slovakia's first ever goal at a World Cup, netting in the 1–1 draw with New Zealand on 15 June 2010. Vittek also scored two goals against defending World Cup holders Italy on 24 June 2010 to knock them out of the competition and subsequently ensured that Slovakia progressed to the 2010 FIFA World Cup knockout stage. On 28 June 2010, Slovakia lost 2–1 to the Netherlands in their first knockout stage match, in which Vittek converted a last-minute penalty to become Slovakia's top international scorer. With four goals in the competition, he also became the joint top scorer at the stage that Slovakia were knocked out. He scored only one goal fewer than Germany's Thomas Müller, who won the Golden Boot.

After the World Cup, Vittek was not a regular on the team in the Euro 2012 qualifiers, playing in only three matches as Slovakia failed to qualify for UEFA Euro 2012 by ending fourth in their group. Vittek also didn't feature in Slovakia's 2014 World Cup qualifiers. After a period of national wilderness of almost two years, Vittek was chosen in the squad for Slovakia's Euro 2016 qualifiers against Spain and Ukraine. He was an unused substitute in the 2–0 defeat to Spain but started in the 0–0 draw against Ukraine.

Career statistics

Scores and results list Slovakia's goal tally first, score column indicates score after each Vittek goal.

Honours
1. FC Nürnberg
 2. Bundesliga: 2003–04 (promoted)
 DFB-Pokal: 2006–07

Slovan Bratislava
 Slovak Super Liga: 2013–14, 2018–19

Individual
 Slovak Footballer of the Year: 2006

References

External links

 
 
 
 
 

1982 births
Living people
Footballers from Bratislava
Association football forwards
Slovak footballers
Slovakia international footballers
2010 FIFA World Cup players
Slovak Super Liga players
Süper Lig players
Bundesliga players
Ligue 1 players
Nemzeti Bajnokság I players
MKE Ankaragücü footballers
ŠK Slovan Bratislava players
1. FC Nürnberg players
Lille OSC players
İstanbul Başakşehir F.K. players
Trabzonspor footballers
Debreceni VSC players
Slovak expatriate footballers
Slovak expatriate sportspeople in Germany
Expatriate footballers in Germany
Slovak expatriate sportspeople in France
Expatriate footballers in France
Slovak expatriate sportspeople in Turkey
Expatriate footballers in Turkey
Slovak expatriate sportspeople in Hungary
Expatriate footballers in Hungary